Göran Johansson can refer to:

 Göran Johansson (politician) (1945–2014), Swedish politician
 Göran Johansson (rower) (born 1957) (1957–2021), Swedish Olympic rower
 Göran Johansson (speed skater, born 1941), Swedish Olympic speed skater
 Göran Johansson (speed skater, born 1958), Swedish Olympic speed skater
 Stig-Göran Johansson (1943–2002), Swedish ice hockey player